Isabel Kershner is a British-born Israeli journalist and author, who began reporting from Jerusalem for The New York Times in 2007. Kershner had previously worked as senior Middle East editor for The Jerusalem Report magazine. She has also written for The New Republic and has provided commentary on Middle East affairs on BBC Radio and elsewhere.

Career
Kershner was born in Manchester, England. She completed a degree in Oriental Studies from the University of Oxford. In April 1992, she married author Hirsh Goodman, a fellow immigrant to Israel; the couple have two children, Gavriel and Lev. Kershner speaks Hebrew and Arabic.

Criticism
In her role reporting on Israeli-Palestinian issues, she has been accused of conflict of interest, as her son has served in the Israel Defense Forces, and her husband is an employee of the Institute for National Security Studies, which has been accused of being involved in promoting a positive image of Israel, and which Kershner often relies on as a source.

Bibliography
 Barrier: The Seam of the Israeli-Palestinian Conflict. London: Palgrave Macmillan, 2005.

Notes

Year of birth missing (living people)
Living people
Writers from Manchester
British journalists
British writers
British magazine editors
The New York Times writers